Sheikh Hasina National Youth Center is a state owned national research institute that researches youth education and is located in Savar, Bangladesh.

History
Sheikh Hasina National Youth Center was established in 1998. In February 2017, the Cabinet of Bangladesh approved the Sheikh Hasina National Youth Development Centre Act-2017 to turn it into an institute. The centre would be governed by an executive council. It is under the Department of Youth Development of the Ministry of Youth and Sports.

References

Research institutes in Bangladesh
1998 establishments in Bangladesh
Organisations based in Savar